William Palmes (c. 1638–1718), of Lindley, North Yorkshire and Ashwell, Rutland was an English landowner and Whig politician who sat in the English and British House of Commons between 1668 and 1713.

Early life and family 

Palmes was the second son of Sir Brian Palmes and his wife Mary Tevery, the daughter of Gervase Tevery of Stapleford. He was educated at Wadham College, Oxford between 7 November 1655 and 1659. He succeeded his brother to the family estates in 1657. On 15 July 1663 he married the Hon. Mary Eure, younger daughter and co-heiress of William Eure (d.1645) of Malton, 6th Baron Eure.

Political career
Palmes was appointed High Sheriff of Rutland for May–November 1662. He was elected MP for Malton in a by-election on 6 October 1668 and was subsequently returned as MP for Malton until 1681. He was returned again for Malton at the 1689 English general election and held the seat until the 1713 British general election.

Death and legacy
Palmes fell into financial difficulties and sold the manor of Malton in 1713. Little is known of  his last years, but he may have  been in the Fleet prison, as he was buried  at St Martin, Ludgate on 5 February 1716. He and his wife had four sons and four daughters, but were survived by just one daughter, Elizabeth, who married Sir William Strickland, 3rd Baronet, of Boynton.

References 

1638 births
Year of death missing
Alumni of Wadham College, Oxford
English MPs 1661–1679
High Sheriffs of Rutland
English MPs 1679
English MPs 1680–1681
English MPs 1681
English MPs 1689–1690
English MPs 1690–1695
English MPs 1695–1698
English MPs 1698–1700
English MPs 1701
English MPs 1701–1702
English MPs 1702–1705
English MPs 1705–1707
British MPs 1707–1708
British MPs 1708–1710
British MPs 1710–1713
Members of the Parliament of Great Britain for English constituencies